Mrs. Dane's Defence is a 1933 British drama film directed by A. V. Bramble and starring Joan Barry, Basil Gill and Francis James. It was an adaptation of the 1900 play Mrs Dane's Defence by Henry Arthur Jones. The play had previously been adapted into an American silent film.

It was made at Wembley Studios as a quota quickie for release by the British subsidiary of Paramount Pictures.

Cast
 Joan Barry as Mrs Dane
 Basil Gill as Sir Daniel Carteret
 Francis James as Lionel Carteret
 Ben Field as Mr Bulsom-Porter
 Clare Greet as Mrs Bulsom-Porter
 Evan Thomas as James Risby
 Evelyn Walsh Hall as Lady Eastney

References

Bibliography
 Low, Rachael. Filmmaking in 1930s Britain. George Allen & Unwin, 1985.
 Wood, Linda. British Films, 1927-1939. British Film Institute, 1986.

External links

1933 films
1933 drama films
Films directed by A. V. Bramble
British drama films
British films based on plays
Quota quickies
Films shot at Wembley Studios
British black-and-white films
1930s English-language films
1930s British films